Danielle Spencer (born 16 May 1969) is an Australian actress, singer and songwriter.

Early life
Spencer is the daughter of Australian songwriter, singer and television entertainer Don Spencer and his wife Julie (née Horsfall), a caterer from Yorkshire. She has an older brother, Dean. At age four, she began piano lessons. During her teens she began acting and composing her own tunes. Until the age of twelve, she spent her childhood and youth alternately in Australia and in Yorkshire and Cambridgeshire, England, as her father worked in both countries for the BBC Play School.

Career
Spencer grew up in close contact with the world of showbusiness. Occasionally she accompanied her father on his performances on stage. She took singing and acting lessons and dance classes in classical ballet and modern dance and jazz. From 1989 to 2000 she worked as an actress, especially for Australian television, primarily as an actress in TV series. Subsequently, the focus of her artistic activity shifted to the area of singer / songwriter.

In 2001 she released her debut musical album, White Monkey. After a family break, in February 2010 she released her second album, Calling All Magicians. Under the direction of her husband, the music videos were made to the title songs and "Tickle Me" and "Wish I'd Been Here".

In August 2011 Spencer for the first time gave two live concerts alongside her husband. The pair joined the musicians and actors Alan Doyle, Kevin Durand, Scott Grimes and the group Size2Shoes to present the Crowe / Doyle Songbook Vol III at St John´s, Newfoundland, Canada. Songs from this album relate, among others, to the novel Dirt Music by the Australian novelist Tim Winton. Spencer gives live concerts on a regular basis. For her live concert tour in October 2011, titled "Alone and Together", she joined Australian bass player Steve Balbi.

In March 2012, Spencer was announced as a contestant for season 12 of Dancing with the Stars on the Seven Network in which she placed second. Her professional partner was Damian Whitewood.

Spencer is a supporter of the Australian Children’s Music Foundation (ACMF), an educational program for underprivileged and indigenous children in Australia. She´s supporter of women’s cancer programs as the Pink Ribbon Breakfast for breast cancer and The Girls Night.
In 1987 Danielle Spencer starred in Rasputin as one of the Tsar's daughters and dated Terry Serio who also starred in the same musical as Prince Felix.

Personal life

Spencer began an on-again, off-again relationship with actor Russell Crowe in 1989, when they co-starred in the movie The Crossing. The film appeared in Australian cinemas in 1990. Crowe and Spencer married on 7 April 2003 at Crowe's farm in Nana Glen, New South Wales. They have two sons: one born in 2003 and another in 2006. In October 2012, it was reported that Crowe and Spencer had separated. The divorce was finalized in April 2018.

Discography

Albums
 White Monkey (EMI, 1 May 2002)
 Calling All Magicians (15 February 2010)

Singles

Filmography

Film

Television

References

External links

 
Collection of video clips showing interviews and Spencer performing songs on thoroughlyrussellcrowe.com. Retrieved 26 December 2011
 Photo portrait Danielle Spencer dated October 2011 on dailytelegraph.com.au. Retrieved 6 November 2011
Official Myspace
  Danielle Spencer - Wish I'd Been Here on www.dailymusicguide.com, November 2009
 Interview with Spencer on her work as a musician, December 2011, undercover interviews, retrievable on youtube.com retrieved 15 December 2011

Living people
Australian television actresses
Australian women singers
Australian film actresses
People educated at Davidson High School
Australian people of English descent
Place of birth missing (living people)
1969 births
Chatswood, New South Wales